Chen Guofu or Chen Kuo-fu (5 October 1892 – 25 August 1951), was a Chinese politician in the Republic of China. His given name was Zudao, though he was more widely known as Guofu.

He was born in Wuxing, Zhejiang, China (modern Huzhou). Chen Guofu joined the Tongmenghui in 1911. He participated in both the revolution against the Qing dynasty and the "second revolution" against Yuan Shikai. He restarted his political career in 1924, being nominated as member of the Kuomintang Central Audit, as well as head of the Department of Organization and president of the Central Financial Committee. Together with his younger brother Chen Lifu, he organized the CC Clique or Central Club Clique of the Kuomintang.  He was chairman of the government of Jiangsu from 1933 to 1937. During the Second Sino-Japanese War, Chen suggested opening the dikes of the Yellow River to halt the Japanese advance, resulting in the 1938 Yellow River flood. He left for Taiwan in December 1948, and died in Taipei on August 25, 1951.

1892 births
1951 deaths
Chinese anti-communists
People of the Northern Expedition
Chinese people of World War II
Politicians from Huzhou
Politicians of Taiwan
Republic of China politicians from Zhejiang
Taiwanese people from Zhejiang
Members of the Control Yuan